In production, research, retail, and accounting, a cost is the value of money that has been used up to produce something or deliver a service, and hence is not available for use anymore. In business, the cost may be one of acquisition, in which case the amount of money expended to acquire it is counted as cost. In this case, money is the input that is gone in order to acquire the thing. This acquisition cost may be the sum of the cost of production as incurred by the original producer, and further costs of transaction as incurred by the acquirer over and above the price paid to the producer. Usually, the price also includes a mark-up for profit over the cost of production.

More generalized in the field of economics, cost is a metric that is totaling up as a result of a process or as a differential for the result of a decision.  Hence cost is the metric used in the standard modeling paradigm applied to economic processes.

Costs (pl.) are often further described based on their timing or their applicability.

Types of accounting costs 

In accounting, costs are the monetary value of expenditures for supplies, services, labor, products, equipment and other items purchased for use by a business or other accounting entity. It is the amount denoted on invoices as the price and recorded in book keeping records as an expense or asset cost basis.

Opportunity cost, also referred to as economic cost is the value of the best alternative that was not chosen in order to pursue the current endeavor—i.e., what could have been accomplished with the resources expended in the undertaking. It represents opportunities forgone.

In theoretical economics, cost used without qualification often means opportunity cost.

The cost concept of accounting 
The cost concept depicts that an asset must be recorded on the purchase value. Economic and operational factors should not lead to changes in the value of cost recorded for the business.

For instance, if the company opts to follow the cost concept, the PPE purchase in the past must remain on the cost. For instance, land purchase by the company remains the same without applying depreciation and revaluation. However, if the company opts to follow the revaluation method, it can update the cost by passing a journal entry. Further, this journal entry impacts the OCI and assets in the balance sheet.

For instance, if the revaluation is made, the following journal entry is posted in the accounting system.

The debit impact of the transaction is recording an increase in the asset value. On the other hand, credit impact is recording unrealized gains in equity. As we keep on charging depreciation, the unrealized gain keeps on decreasing and being realized. However, it's limited to additional depreciation due to revaluation.

On the other hand, if the business opts to follow the cost concept, it's not allowed to record revaluation. The cost concept comes with the following pros and cons.

Pros of cost concept in accounting. 

 It is easy to locate the purchase price of an asset. There is no revaluation, and there is no change in the amount/balance of the asset.
 It is easy to locate the cost of the assets as there is no judgment. Instead, there is objectivity. For instance, you record assets at the purchased price.
 A higher degree of judgment is involved in the process of revaluation.
 It is often difficult to trace the movement in revalued assets.
 Organizations following the revaluation concept need to apply technical accounting rules regarding unrealized gain, and depreciation.

Cons of cost concept in accounting 
Books do not reflect present/fair value. Hence, financial statement may not present the true picture of the business.

Comparing private, external, and social costs

When a transaction takes place, it typically involves both private costs and external costs.

Private costs are the costs that the buyer of a good or service pays the seller. This can also be described as the costs internal to the firm's production function.

External costs (also called externalities), in contrast, are the costs that people other than the buyer are forced to pay as a result of the transaction. The bearers of such costs can be either particular individuals or society at large. Note that external costs are often both non-monetary and problematic to quantify for comparison with monetary values. They include things like pollution, things that society will likely have to pay for in some way or at some time in the future, even so that are not included in transaction prices.

Social costs are the sum of private costs and external costs.

For example, the manufacturing cost of a car (i.e., the costs of buying inputs, land tax rates for the car plant, overhead costs of running the plant and labor costs) reflects the private cost for the manufacturer (in some ways, normal profit can also be seen as a cost of production; see, e.g., Ison and Wall, 2007, p. 181). The polluted waters or polluted air also created as part of the process of producing the car is an external cost borne by those who are affected by the pollution or who value unpolluted air or water. Because the manufacturer does not pay for this external cost (the cost of emitting undesirable waste into the commons), and does not include this cost in the price of the car (a Kaldor-Hicks compensation), they are said to be external to the market pricing mechanism. The air pollution from driving the car is also an externality produced by the car user in the process of using his good. The driver does not compensate for the environmental damage caused by using the car.

Cost estimation

When developing a business plan for a new or existing company, product or project, planners typically make cost estimates in order to assess whether revenues/benefits will cover costs (see cost-benefit analysis). This is done in both business and government. Costs are often underestimated, resulting in cost overrun during execution.

(Cost-plus pricing) is where the price equals cost plus a percentage of overhead or profit margin.

Manufacturing costs vs. non-manufacturing costs 
Manufacturing costs are those costs that are directly involved in manufacturing of products. Examples of manufacturing costs include raw materials costs and charges related to workers. Manufacturing cost is divided into three broad categories:

Direct materials cost.
Direct labor cost.
Manufacturing overhead cost.
 
Non-manufacturing costs are those costs that are not directly incurred in manufacturing a product. Examples of such costs are salary of sales personnel and advertising expenses. Generally, non-manufacturing costs are further classified into two categories:

Selling and distribution costs.
Administrative costs.

Other costs

A defensive cost is an environmental expenditure to eliminate or prevent environmental damage. Defensive costs form part of the genuine progress indicator (GPI) calculations.

Labour costs would include travel time, holiday pay, training costs, working clothes, social insurance, taxes on employment &c.

Path cost is a term in networking to define the worthiness of a path, see Routing.

See also

 Average cost
 Cost accounting
 Cost curve
 Cost object
 Direct cost
 Fixed cost
 Incremental cost
 Indirect cost
 Life-cycle cost
 Outline of industrial organization
 Repugnancy costs
 Semi-variable cost
 Total cost
 Variable cost

References

Further reading 

 William Baumol (1968), Entrepreneurship in Economic Theory. American Economic Review, Papers and Proceedings.
 Stephen Ison and Stuart Wall (2007), Economics, 4th Edition, Harlow, England; New York: FT Prentice Hall.
 Israel Kirzner (1979), Perception, Opportunity and Profit, Chicago: University of Chicago Press.